EYP may refer to:

 Early Years Professional Status
 El Alcaraván Airport in Yopal, Colombia
 European Youth Parliament
 Export Yellow Pages
 Hellenic National Intelligence Service